Signal 1 is an Independent Local Radio station owned and operated by Bauer as part of the Hits Radio network. It broadcasts to Staffordshire and South Cheshire. 

As of December 2022, the station has a weekly audience of 176,000 listeners according to RAJAR.

History
Signal Radio began broadcasting at 6am on Monday 5 September 1983. The first voice on air was breakfast presenter John Evington and the first song played was Beautiful Noise by Neil Diamond. Originally, Signal Radio aired as a single full service station on 104.3 MHz and 1170 kHz (257 metres). The station's name was derived from Signal, the local newspaper in the Five Town novels by Staffordshire writer Arnold Bennett.

Signal began broadcasting to south Cheshire on 96.4 FM in 1989, before opening a new frequency for the Stafford area on 96.9 FM a year later. The two frequencies began carrying a new alternative AOR-led service, Echo 96, in October 1990. Echo continued for around a year in Stafford while the Cheshire frequency was merged with that of the short-lived Stockport ILR station KFM to form Signal Cheshire in 1991. By the end of the year, the Stafford service was relaunched as Signal Stafford, carrying opt-out programming from the Stoke-based service.

In Staffordshire, Signal Radio began carrying a separate Golden Breakfast Show on 1170 AM in 1992 in order to provide separate services on AM and FM and avoid relinquishing frequencies. The AM opt-out gradually expanded into a full-time separate station, Signal 2.

Signal Radio was bought in 1999 by The Wireless Group, which was subsequently acquired by UTV Media six years later for £97 million. Following the sale of its television assets, the group was latterly bought by News Corp in September 2016.

In 2000, Signal's Cheshire service was split into two – 96.4 FM was merged with the Staffordshire service while 104.9 FM was relaunched as Imagine FM, a dedicated service for south Manchester and Cheshire, which was latterly sold onto become a wholly independent station in 2009.

Signal 1 celebrated its 30th birthday on Saturday 10 August 2013 with a special concert at Betley Court Farm in Crewe.

On 8 February 2019, Signal 1 and the Wireless Group's network of local radio stations in Great Britain were sold to Bauer. The sale was ratified in March 2020 following an inquiry by the Competition and Markets Authority.

In May 2020, Bauer announced that Signal 1 would join the Hits Radio network, while retaining its on-air branding.

Signal 1 began carrying off-peak programming from the Hits Radio network in Manchester on 15 June 2020, marking the end of networked output for the Wireless Group's local stations, produced in-house at Signal's studios in Stoke.

Signal 1 officially joined the Hits Radio network on 20 July 2020. Local programming was reduced to a weekday breakfast show, alongside hourly local news bulletins and peak-time traffic updates.

In November 2022 it was announced that from the following January, Signal 1's relay transmitters on 96.4 and 96.9 FM would transition to carrying Greatest Hits Radio, with the main 102.6 FM transmission - to the area where GHR broadcasts on AM via the former Signal 2 - retaining Signal 1 and Hits network output.

Station information

Studios
Signal 1's studios are based on Stoke Road in the Shelton area of Stoke-on-Trent in a building previously occupied as a warehouse. There are seven dedicated studios as well as a studio for live music recordings, previously used for Signal 2 and networked output for the Wireless Group.

Technical
Signal 1's main transmitter is at Alsagers Bank, broadcasting on 102.6 FM. As well as covering North Staffordshire and South Cheshire, the transmitter can be received well into the North West and down into the West Midlands, due to the height of the transmitter. Signal 1 also had relay transmitters at Pye Green, covering Stafford and the surrounding area on 96.9 FM, and at Sutton Common, covering Congleton, Macclesfield and surrounding areas on 96.4 FM. However in January 2023, these switched over to carrying Greatest Hits Radio Staffordshire and Cheshire.

Signal 1 also broadcasts on the local Stoke and Stafford DAB multiplex 12D.

Signal Radio Media Academy
In 2012, Signal 1 lent its name to the Signal Radio Media Academy, a course run by Stoke on Trent College as a BTEC Level 3 Extended Diploma in Radio Production. For two days a week, the course is based at the Burslem Campus of Stoke on Trent College where the students also run their own radio station, Heatwave Radio. Teaching takes places both at the college in Burslem as well at Signal's studios in Shelton, with specialist input from the station's staff.

Outside broadcasting and events 
Occasional outside broadcasts are made in a specially built OB studio on a converted bus. The station's roadshow unit has a self-contained stage and PA system on board. The Signal Radio Street Team also go out and about the area representing the station. Most Street Team members are part of the Signal Radio Media Academy and many have gone on to other roles across the network including presenting, producing and sales.

In recent years, Signal Radio has also hosted annual events for local children's charities under the Help a Signal Child banner.

Programming
All networked programming originates from Bauer’s Manchester studios.

Local programming is produced and broadcast from Bauer’s Stoke-on-Trent studios each weekday from 6-10am.

News
Bauer’s Stoke-on-Trent newsroom broadcasts local news bulletins on the hour from 6am-7pm on weekdays and between 7am-1pm at weekends, with headlines on the half hour during breakfast and drivetime on weekdays. The local bulletins are simulcast on Greatest Hits Radio Midlands in Staffordshire and Cheshire.

National bulletins from Sky News Radio in London are broadcast on the hour at all other times.

References

External links
 Signal 1
 Listening Room – first 25 years of Signal Radio
 History of local radio in Staffordshire
 Alsagers Bank transmitter, near to Newcastle-under-Lyme
 Sutton Common transmitter, near Macclesfield
 Pye Green transmitter, near Stafford

Mass media in Stoke-on-Trent
Radio stations established in 1983
Signal
Bauer Radio
Hits Radio
Contemporary hit radio stations in the United Kingdom